Horace King (19 December 1928 – 15 November 2016) was a Barbadian cricketer. He played in three first-class matches for the Barbados cricket team from 1948 to 1953.

King attended Harrison College in Barbados. A left-arm spinner, he retired from cricket at the age of 24 to study surveying in England. He became Chief Surveyor of Barbados. His younger brother Tony also played for Barbados.

See also
 List of Barbadian representative cricketers

References

External links
 

1928 births
2016 deaths
Barbadian cricketers
Barbados cricketers
People from Saint Michael, Barbados
Surveyors